Firstborn Laestadians are a subgroup within the Laestadian Lutheran revival movement. The Firstborn are known for their traditionalism and their conservative pietistic ideals, and they seek to avoid "worldly pleasures". The name "Firstborn" derives from the Bible's Epistle to the Hebrews, Heb. 12:23, which mentions "the church of the firstborn". 

In Sweden, Firstborn Laestadians are often known as "West Laestadians" and have adopted a more critical attitude towards the Church of Sweden than other Laestadian groups. 

In the US and Canada, the Firstborn organized as the Old Apostolic Lutheran Church around the turn of the twentieth century. There are congregations in Alaska, British Columbia, Washington state, Wyoming, Montana, South Dakota, North Dakota, Minnesota, Michigan, Ontario, Delaware, North Carolina, New York, Washington, D.C. and Connecticut. The Firstborn are the largest Laestadian subgroup in the US.

There are also many Firstborn Laestadian congregations in Finland and Norway, one congregation in Denmark, and some activity in Russia, Estonia, Latvia, the Netherlands, Germany and Great Britain.

American and Canadian congregations always use the King James Version of the Bible. In Finland, the Finnish Bible of 1776 is used. Both Bible versions are based on the Textus Receptus.
 
The Firstborn all over the world consider the congregation in Swedish Lapland, where the Laestadian movement began, as their mother congregation. The Christmas meeting in Gällivare, Sweden, is the most important annual event for Firstborn Laestadians.

Division of Firstborn Laestadianism of Finland in 2016
In 2016 Firstborn Laestadianism in Finland divided into two factions based on views concerning administering Holy Communion and Baptism by lay preachers in their own prayer houses. In August 2016 the new Association Esikoiset ry was founded by Firstborn Laestadians who want to receive Sacraments in fellowship with the Evangelical Lutheran Church of Finland, a National Church of Finland.

On 13 August 2016 Firstborn Laestadian preachers who do not accept administration of sacraments by lay preachers met in Hämeenlinna's prayer house. Some of the Firstborn Laestadians' preachers started to serve in the new Association. From the meeting of preachers in Hämeenlinna, they emphasized that in the new Association they want to receive sacraments in fellowship with the Evangelical Lutheran Church and work within the Church in accordance with the traditional policy of Firstborn Laestadianism. The preachers' message was that division of the revival movement does not mean change in the theology of Firstborn Laestadianism, even in the new Association. Preachers said that they will fight against liberalism and secularization together with other conservatives within the Church.

Notable Firstborn 
 Erik August Larsson
 Toivo Sukari, a Finnish businessman involved in the 2007 Finnish campaign finance scandal.

See also
Lars Levi Laestadius

References

External links
Esikoiset ry
The Firstborn: A Historical Survey (PDF)

Laestadianism